New Milford is a borough in Susquehanna County, Pennsylvania, United States. The population was 817 at the 2020 census. Children living in New Milford are served by the schools in the Blue Ridge School District, including Blue Ridge High School.

Geography

History
The borough of New Milford was formed from part of New Milford Township in December 1859.

Demographics

At the 2010 census there were 868 people, 379 households, and 232 families residing in the borough. The population density was 868 people per square mile (339.1/km2). There were 421 housing units at an average density of 421 per square mile (164.5/km2). The racial makeup of the borough was 97.2% White, 1% African American, 0.2% Asian, 0.8% from other races, and 0.7% from two or more races. Hispanic or Latino of any race were 1.5%.

Of the 379 households, 29.3% had children under the age of 18 living with them, 43.5% were married couples living together, 11.1% had a female householder with no husband present, and 38.8% were non-families. 31.7% of households were one person, and 10.3% were one person aged 65 or older. The average household size was 2.29 and the average family size was 2.85.

In the borough the population was spread out, with 22.4% under the age of 18, 62.2% from 18 to 64, and 15.4% 65 or older. The median age was 40.6 years.

The median household income was $38,611 and the median family income was $50,000. Males had a median income of $40,870 versus $26,071 for females. The per capita income for the borough was $20,067. About 8.3% of families and 11.7% of the population were below the poverty line, including 16.4% of those under age 18 and 3.6% of those age 65 or over.

See also
Page Lake
Pratt Memorial Library

References

External links

Boroughs in Susquehanna County, Pennsylvania
Populated places established in 1789
1859 establishments in Pennsylvania